Inder (Industria Electromecánica de Recreativos S.A, Madrid) was a Spanish manufacturer of pinball machines which was in business between 1970 and 1993. Francisco Maestre was the director of Inder for many years. Inder experimented with the use of CRT monitors in their pinball machine's backboxes. The result was a hybrid game called Flip VI which came out in 1990. In 2010 the Spanish company Marsaplay produced 25 prototypes of New Canasta, which is a remake of Inder's original Canasta pinball machine.

List of Inder Pinball Machines
250 cc
Atleta
Black & Reed
Brave Team
Bushido
Canasta 86
Centaur
Clown
Corsario
Fifteen
Flip-VI
Hearts Gain
Hot & Cold
Keops
Lap By Lap
Luck Smile
Metal Man
Miss Universo
Moon Light
Mundial 90
Running Horse
Screech
Seven Winner
Shamrock
Skateboard
Stripping Funny
Super Bowling
Tasty Samba
Topaz
Touch
Up Away
Yale

References

See also
 Zaccaria (company), a former Italian company of pinball and arcade machines
 Taito of Brazil, a former Brazilian company of pinball and arcade machines
 Maresa, a former Spanish company of pinball machines
 Sega, S.A. SONIC, a former Spanish company of pinball and arcade machines

Entertainment companies of Spain
Manufacturing companies of Spain
Pinball manufacturers
Defunct companies of Spain
Defunct manufacturing companies of Spain